Route 136 is a provincial highway located in the Capitale-Nationale region of Quebec. The highway runs from Autoroute 440 (Autoroute Dufferin-Montmorency) to Autoroute 73 near the Pierre Laporte and Quebec bridges in Quebec City. A short route, most of Route 136 is a parkway along the Saint Lawrence River connecting the Basse-Ville of Old Quebec to the bridges. The eastern section follows city streets in that community.

Route 136 is shown in the Quebec Ministry of Transportation road network map but is not identified as such on some other maps. It is also known as Boulevard Champlain for most of its length as well as several other short streets near A-440, following the north shore of the Saint Lawrence River just south of downtown.

Municipalities along Route 136
 Quebec City
 Sainte-Foy–Sillery–Cap-Rouge
 La Cité-Limoilou

See also
 List of Quebec provincial highways

References

External links
 Interactive Provincial Route Map (Transports Québec) 

136
Streets in Quebec City